The Lola T380 is a 3-litre Group 5 sports prototype, designed, developed and built by British manufacturer and constructor Lola, for sports car racing, in 1975.

References

Sports prototypes
T380